A partial lunar eclipse will take place on Wednesday, January 12, 2028.

Visibility
It will be completely visible over Europe, western Africa and the Americas, and will be seen setting over the rest of Africa and western Asia.

Related lunar eclipses

Eclipses in 2028
 A partial lunar eclipse on Wednesday, 12 January 2028.
 An annular solar eclipse on Wednesday, 26 January 2028.
 A partial lunar eclipse on Thursday, 6 July 2028.
 A total solar eclipse on Saturday, 22 July 2028.
 A total lunar eclipse on Sunday, 31 December 2028.

Saros series 
It is part of Saros series 115.

Lunar year series

Half-Saros cycle
A lunar eclipse will be preceded and followed by solar eclipses by 9 years and 5.5 days (a half saros). This lunar eclipse is related to two partial solar eclipses of Solar Saros 122.

See also
List of lunar eclipses and List of 21st-century lunar eclipses

Notes

External links

2028-01
2028-01
2028 in science